Hermann Hunger (born 1942), an Austrian Assyriologist, professor emeritus of Assyriology at the University of Vienna, from which he retired in 2007. He has been recognized for his work on Babylonian astronomy and celestial omens.

Biography 
Hermann Hunger is son of the Byzantinist Herbert Hunger.

Education 
Hunger studied oriental studies at the University of Vienna after graduating in 1960. In 1963/64 he studied Assyriology and Arabic at the University of Heidelberg and from 1964 to 1966 at the University of Münster, where he received his doctorate in Assyriology and Semitic philology in 1966 under Wolfram von Soden (Babylonian and Assyrian colophones).

Academic work 
From 1967 to 1970 he was an epigraphist member at the German Archaeological Institute in Baghdad. From 1970 to 1973 he was Research Associate at the University of Chicago and then until 1976 assistant at the Institute for Oriental Studies at the University of Vienna, where he completed his habilitation. From 1976 to 1978 he was Associate Professor at the University of Chicago Oriental Institute and from 1978 he was Associate Professor of Assyriology at the University of Vienna, where he retired in 2007.

He is considered one of the leading authorities on Babylonian astronomy history, where he worked early with Otto Neugebauer and Abraham Sachs, and later with David Pingree. He was collaborator in the Chicago Assyrian Dictionary.

Hunger is a member of the American Philosophical Society and the Austrian Academy of Sciences, of which he is chairman of the Commission for the History of Natural Sciences, Mathematics and Medicine and the Mycenaean Commission. In 2010 he became an honorary member of the American Oriental Society. Hunger is co-editor of the Archiv für Orientforschung.

Halley's Comet 

Hunger translated a cuneiform tablet from the Babylonian astronomical diaries that describes the appearance of Halley's Comet in 163 BCE.

Published works

References 

1942 births
Living people
People from Bautzen
Austrian Assyriologists
Archaeoastronomers
Austrian orientalists
20th-century Austrian historians
Academic staff of the University of Vienna
Austrian people of German descent

Members of the American Philosophical Society
21st-century Austrian historians